Gyrininae is a subfamily of ground and water beetles in the family Gyrinidae. There are at least 740 described extant species in Gyrininae.

Genera
Taxonomy after

 Dineutini 
 Cretodineutus  - Burmese amber, Late Cretaceous (Cenomanian)
 Cretogyrus  - Burmese amber, Cenomanian
 Dineutus 
 Enhydrus 
 Macrogyrus  (including Andogyrus )
 Mesodineutes  - Darmakan Formation, Russia, Danian
 Miodineutes  - Germany, Miocene
 Porrorhynchus 
 Gyrinini 
 Aulonogyrus 
 Gyrinoides 
 Gyrinus 
 Metagyrinus 
 Orectochilini 
 Gyretes 
 Orectochilus 
 Orectogyrus 
 Patrus 
 Chimerogyrus  - Burmese amber, Cenomanian

References

 Lawrence, J. F., and A. F. Newton Jr. / Pakaluk, James, and Stanislaw Adam Slipinski, eds. (1995). "Families and subfamilies of Coleoptera (with selected genera, notes, references and data on family-group names)". Biology, Phylogeny, and Classification of Coleoptera: Papers Celebrating the 80th Birthday of Roy A. Crowson, vol. 2, 779–1006.
 Miller, Kelly B., and Johannes Bergsten (2012). "Phylogeny and classification of whirligig beetles (Coleoptera: Gyrinidae): relaxed-clock model outperforms parsimony and time-free Bayesian analyses". Systematic Entomology, vol. 37, no. 4, 706–746.
 Roughley, R. E. / Arnett, Ross H. Jr., and Michael C. Thomas, eds. (2001). "Family 7. Gyrinidae Latreille, 1810". American Beetles, vol. 1: Archostemata, Myxophaga, Adephaga, Polyphaga: Staphyliniformia, 133–137.

Further reading

 Arnett, R. H. Jr., and M. C. Thomas. (eds.). (21 December 2000) American Beetles, Volume I: Archostemata, Myxophaga, Adephaga, Polyphaga: Staphyliniformia. CRC Press LLC, Boca Raton, Florida. 
 Arnett, Ross H. (2000). American Insects: A Handbook of the Insects of America North of Mexico. CRC Press.
 Richard E. White. (1983). Peterson Field Guides: Beetles. Houghton Mifflin Company.

Gyrinidae